The Hippotes's miner bee (Andrena hippotes) is a species of miner bee in the family Andrenidae. It is found in North America.

References

Further reading

 
 

hippotes
Articles created by Qbugbot
Insects described in 1895